Spanish Canyon, is a canyon that has its head near the middle of the southwest slope of Alvord Mountain below Impassable Pass at  and trends south to its mouth, 1.6 miles east northeast of Alvord Well at an elevation of . The canyon is named for the Old Spanish Trail which passed through the canyon.

History
Spanish Canyon was first traveled by the New Mexican caravans of the Old Spanish Trail between Bitter Spring and the Mojave River part of one of the three routes that came to be called the Old Spanish Trail. It was later traveled by wagons of Mormons and Forty-niners who established the wagon road between Salt Lake City and Los Angeles, called the Mormon Road between 1847 and 1849. By 1855 it became part of the route of the freight wagon road between Los Angeles and Salt Lake City.

References

Valleys of San Bernardino County, California
History of San Bernardino County, California
Old Spanish Trail (trade route)
Mormon Road